The Sumatran striped rabbit (Nesolagus netscheri), also known as the Sumatra short-eared rabbit or Sumatran rabbit, is a rabbit found only in forests in the Barisan Mountains in western Sumatra, Indonesia, and surrounding areas. It is threatened by habitat loss.

Related species
This rabbit was the sole representative of the genus Nesolagus until the Annamite striped rabbit was described in 2000.

Description
The Sumatran striped rabbit weighs 1.5 kg and is between 368 and 417 mm in total length, with a tail 17 mm long, skull length of 67–74 mm, hind foot length of 67–87 mm, and ear length of 34–45 mm. It has black or dark brown stripes on a yellowish grey background that becomes rusty brown towards the rump; the fur on the underparts, on the inside of the legs and below the chin is whitish. The black ears are very short and when folded forward reach only to the eye. The limbs are grey-brown and the rumped tail is reddish. It can be differentiated from Oryctolagus cuniculus, which is sometimes kept in captivity in Sumatra and is of a similar size, by Oryctolagus'''s plain grey-brown fur lacking stripes and slightly longer ears. Their fur is soft and dense, overlaid by longer, harsher hairs.

Biology
As the species is rare, nocturnal and found only in remote forests, little is known about it. The local people do not have a name for the Sumatran rabbit because they are not aware that the species even exists. Indeed, the vernacular terminology for "rabbit" in Indonesia is either borrowed from other languages to refer to foreign species of rabbit (arnab from the Arabic  and kelinci from the Dutch word konijntje) or not distinguished to that of felines (kucing e.g. kucing belanda or kucing tapai'').

The rabbit rests in the burrows of other animals. It usually eats the stalk and leaves of understory plants, but captive rabbits eat grain, and tropical fruits.

Habitat and range
This species is said to be endemic and is native to the Barisan Mountains in Sumatra, Indonesia in north-west Sumatra. It has also been found in west and southwest Sumatra, and there is one record from Gunung Leuser National Park. It lives in forests at altitudes of 600–1600 metres above sea level. It is one of the few lagomorphs that chooses to live in the dense rainforest. The Sumatran rabbit also prefers to live more specifically in montane forests with volcanic soil.

Threats
The forests which the species inhabits are being cleared more and more for timber, tea and coffee plantations, and human inhabitation.

Observation in the wild
Following a sighting in 1972, the Sumatran striped rabbit went unreported until an individual rabbit was photographed in 2000. Since then there have been three reports of this species, all from the Bukit Barisan Selatan National Park: In January 2007 one was photographed with a camera trap, in September 2008 one was photographed by a WWF scientist, and in June 2009 one was observed.  In 2011 examples were photographed in the wild by a scientific team using camera traps in Bukit Barisan Seletan and Kerinci Seblat National Parks. In 2022 a farmer attempted to sell a live striped rabbit, opportunistically caught after a flash flood, on Facebook. Kerinci Seblat National Park authorities confiscated it and returned it to the wild.

Conservation
The species is listed as Data Deficient by the IUCN. It is rarely seen and thought to be uncommon in its habitat; population size is unknown. Its rarity may be the result of deforestation and habitat loss. Attempts to start a conservation plan were not funded due to lack of reliable distribution and abundance information.

References

Leporidae
Mammals of Asia
Mammals of Indonesia
EDGE species
Fauna of Sumatra
Mammals described in 1880